David Aitken may refer to:

 David D. Aitken (1853–1930), U.S. Representative from Michigan
 David A. Aitken, architect in Malaysia
 David Aitken (minister) (1796–1875), Scottish minister and church historian